The Constitutional Court was established by the Constitution of the Third Republic on 18 February 2006 as the highest constitutional authority in the Democratic Republic of the Congo. Its role is to ensure the constitutionality of laws and statues created by government officials and organizations.

Composition
The Court consists of nine members appointed by the President of the Republic, including three appointed by his own initiative, three chosen by the Parliament, and three designated by the High Council of the Judiciary. Two-thirds of the members must by lawyers from the ranks of judges or prosecutors, from the Bar, or from university education. The other basic requirements are being Congolese and having 15 years of experience in legal work.

The non-renewable term for members is nine years. A third of the membership is renewed every three years, with members of the group chosen by drawing lots. The President of the Constitutional Court is elected by the other members for a three-year term, renewable once. He is invested by ordinance of the President of the Republic.

Powers
The Court reviews laws and statues proposed by the President, the Prime Minister, the Senate, the National Assembly, or other government organizations prior to their application, to rule on their conformity with the Constitution. Additionally, the Court examines applications for interpretations of the Constitution at the request of government officials. It settles disputes regarding presidential or parliamentary elections, as well as referendums. Appeals regarding the constitutionality of laws or regulations are also settled by the Court. Judgements of the Constitutional Court cannot be appealed and are enforced immediately.

The Constitutional Court can also be the criminal court for the President or Prime Minister for high treason, failings in matters of honor or integrity, contempt of parliament, or common law offenses, at the request of a two-thirds majority of Parliament.

See also
Court of Cassation (Democratic Republic of the Congo)
Judiciary
Jurisprudence
Rule of law
Rule According to Higher Law

References

External links
Official website

Judiciary of the Democratic Republic of the Congo
Law of the Democratic Republic of the Congo
Politics of the Democratic Republic of the Congo
Political organisations based in the Democratic Republic of the Congo
Congo
Congo, Democratic Republic
2006 establishments in the Democratic Republic of the Congo
Courts and tribunals established in 2006